Nemania effusa is a species of ascomycete fungus in the family Xylariaceae. It is often found living on the dead bark of willow trees. The species was originally named Hypoxylon effusum by German botanist Theodor Rudolph Joseph Nitschke in 1867; Zdeněk Pouzar transferred it to Nemania in 1985.

References

Xylariales
Fungi described in 1867
Fungi of Europe